General Sir Cyril Brudenell Bingham White,  (23 September 1876 – 13 August 1940), more commonly known as Sir Brudenell White or C. B. B. White, was a senior officer in the Australian Army who served as Chief of the General Staff from 1920 to 1923 and again from March to August 1940, when he was killed in the Canberra air disaster.

Early life and career

White was born in St Arnaud, Victoria, on 23 September 1876. He joined the colonial militia force in Queensland in 1896, and served in the Second Boer War with the Australian Commonwealth Horse. In 1901 he became a founding member of the new Australian Army, and in 1906 was the first Australian officer to attend the British staff college. In 1912 he returned to Australia and became Director of Military Operations, at a time when Andrew Fisher's Labor government was expanding Australia's defence capacity.

First World War
When the First World War broke out in August 1914, White supervised the first contingents of the Australian Imperial Force (AIF) to go the front. At Gallipoli, he was chief of staff to Major General Sir William Bridges and then to William Birdwood, gaining the rank of brigadier general. After the evacuation from Gallipoli which he masterminded as "The Silence Ruse", he was Brigadier General, General Staff of I ANZAC Corps in France. In the battle for the Pozières Heights in late July 1916 which ended in failure, the commander of the British Expeditionary Force (BEF) on the Western Front, General Sir Douglas Haig, found fault with Birdwood and White. White stood up to Haig and pointed out that whatever mistakes had been made, the commander-in-chief had been misinformed in several particulars, which White then specified "in detail, item by item". Haig was so impressed that when he had finished he placed his hand on White's shoulder claiming, "I dare say you're right, young man."

During 1917 the value of the Australian troops was being more and more appreciated, but among the troops themselves there was some feeling that they were being too often sacrificed through the mistakes of the higher command. By September White had become convinced that as far as possible piecemeal operations must be avoided, that too great advances should not be attempted, and that there must be a proper use of artillery barrage. These tactics were successfully applied in the Battle of Menin Road on 20 September 1917, and in later thrusts.

Early in 1918, White, realizing the difficulties of repatriation at the end of the war, raised the problem of what would have to be done while the men were waiting for shipping. This led to the educational scheme afterwards adopted. In May, Birdwood and White, at the request of General Sir Henry Rawlinson, commander of the British Fourth Army, prepared plans for an offensive but these were shelved in the meanwhile. When Birdwood was given command of the British Fifth Army, the choice of his successor in command of the Australian Corps lay between Monash and White. Monash was White's senior and, though White's reputation stood very high, it was impossible to pass over so capable and successful an officer as Monash. White was given the important position of Major General, General Staff of Birdwood's army. It was a happy combination, for, though Birdwood was a great leader, he was less interested in organization, and White had a genius for it.

Between the wars
After the war White was appointed Chief of the General Staff from 1920 until his retirement in 1923. In the same year he was appointed Chairman of the newly constituted Commonwealth Public Service Board, supervising the transfer of departments from Melbourne to the new capital, Canberra. In 1928 he chose not to move to Canberra, declining a further term with the Public Service Board in order to remain close to his home and grazing property "Woodnaggerak" near Buangor, Victoria.

Second World War and death
In 1940, as Australia mobilised the Second Australian Imperial Force to take part in the Second World War, White was recalled to service at the age of 63, promoted to general, and re-appointed Chief of the General Staff. The appointment was short-lived, as White was aboard the Royal Australian Air Force plane that crashed in the Canberra air disaster on 13 August 1940, killing all aboard. Monash described him as "far and away the ablest soldier Australia had ever turned out".

Notes

References

 Derham, Rosemary, "The Silence Ruse", Cliffe Books 1998, 

General Cyril Brudenell Bingham White, KCB, KCMG, KCVO, DSO  Biography at the Australian War Memorial

External links

AIF Project database record
 

1876 births
1940 deaths
Accidental deaths in the Australian Capital Territory
Australian Companions of the Distinguished Service Order
Australian generals
Australian Knights Commander of the Order of St Michael and St George
Australian Knights Commander of the Order of the Bath
Australian Knights Commander of the Royal Victorian Order
Australian military personnel killed in World War II
Australian military personnel of the Second Boer War
Australian military personnel of World War I
Australian public servants
Graduates of the Staff College, Camberley
People from St Arnaud
Recipients of the Croix de guerre (Belgium)
Recipients of the Croix de Guerre (France)
Recipients of the Order of the Rising Sun
Victims of aviation accidents or incidents in Australia
Victims of aviation accidents or incidents in 1940
Australian Army personnel of World War II
Military personnel from Victoria (Australia)
Chiefs of Army (Australia)